Christopher Knight is an American art critic for the Los Angeles Times. He was awarded the 2020 Pulitzer Prize for Criticism, after being a three-time finalist (1991, 2001 and 2007). He received the Lifetime Achievement Award for Art Journalism from the Dorothy and Leo Rabkin Foundation in 2020, and the 1997 Frank Jewett Mather Award for Distinction in Art Criticism from the College Art Association, the first journalist to win the award in more than 25 years.

Knight has appeared on CBS' 60 Minutes, PBS' Newshour, NPR's Morning Edition, All Things Considered and CNN, and he was featured in The Art of the Steal, the 2009 documentary on the Barnes Foundation in Philadelphia. He is the author of two books: Last Chance for Eden: Selected Art Criticism, 1979-1994, published in 1995 by Art Issues Press, and Art of the Sixties and Seventies: The Panza Collection, published by Rizzoli in 1989 and reissued in 2003.

Prior to joining the Los Angeles Times in 1989, Knight served as art critic for the Los Angeles Herald Examiner (1980–1989), as assistant director for public information at the Los Angeles County Museum of Art (1979–1980) and as curator of the Museum of Contemporary Art, San Diego (1976–1979). From 1986 to 1989 he also served as a program advisor to the Lannan Foundation with Museum of Modern Art curator John Elderfield and art collector and philanthropist Gifford Philips.

In 1999 Knight was awarded an Honorary Doctor of Fine Arts degree from the Atlanta College of Art. He received his Master's degree in art history from the State University of New York in 1976, and was named Distinguished Alumnus of Hartwick College (Oneonta, New York) in 1999.

References

American art critics
Living people
Year of birth missing (living people)
Place of birth missing (living people)
Atlanta College of Art alumni